The Rogelio Sanchez State Jail is a medium-security prison for men located in El Paso, El Paso County, Texas, with an official capacity of 1100.

References

Prisons in Texas
Buildings and structures in El Paso County, Texas
1996 establishments in Texas